Malice: The Webseries is a horror sci-fi web series created by Eagle Films. The series chronicles the Turner family after they move into their late grandmother's home. When paranormal events begin to occur, it is up to the family's youngest member, teenage Alice, to save the day. The series' protagonist shares the name of and is inspired by Alice, from Lewis Carroll's novel Alice in Wonderland. Malice: The Webseries was compiled into a feature film which debuted on Hulu September 24, 2014.

Malice: Metamorphosis consists of seasons three and four of the webseries. Metamorphosis occurs one year after the events of the second season. As Alice tries to piece her life back together, she is troubled by dreams of an epic medieval battle and the armored specter of her dead father. Totaling twelve additional episodes, the finale of Metamorphosis was released March 22, 2015.

History 
Malice: The Webseries began filming in the summer of 2011. The second season was completed February 2013 . During the summer of 2012, Malice raised $10,170 out of a goal of $8,000 on Kickstarter to finance Season 2.

Malice: Metamorphosis was funded by another successful Kickstarter, which raised $12,195.

Awards 

 April 2, 2014: Malice won "Best Visual Effects" at the Indie Series Awards 
 September 30, 2014: Malice won "Best Editing at ITVFest (Independent Television Festival) 
 Malice was listed in Webvee Guide's most memorable shows of 2014 
Malice was listed 8th on IMDb's Halloween Horrorfest 2014 
 March 29, 2015: Malice won "Best Visual Effects" at the Hollyweb Festival 
 Malice was nominated for several awards at the LA Web Fest 2015:
 MALICE—Outstanding Series
 Philip Cook—Outstanding Director
 Brittany Martz—Outstanding Lead Actress
 MALICE—Outstanding Visual Effects
 Philip Cook—Outstanding Editing
 Philip Cook—Outstanding Sound Design

Notes

External links 
 
 
Streaming Episodes
 Malice on YouTube
 Malice on Hulu

2011 web series debuts
American science fiction web series
YouTube original programming
Kickstarter-funded web series